The Tongyang Cup (Korean: 동양증권배 세계선수권전, Hanja: 東洋證券杯世界選手權戰) was a Go competition. The Tong Yang Cup was sponsored by Tongyang Securities of South Korea. The tournament was run from 1988 to 1998, with players from South Korea, Taiwan, the United States, Japan, China and European countries.

Past winners

International Go competitions